Procter & Gamble Pakistan P&G is a Pakistani consumer goods company which is a subsidiary of American multinational company Procter & Gamble. It is based in Karachi, Pakistan.

The company is operating in fabric care, baby care, hair care, feminine care, beauty and personal care, oral care and healthcare sectors in Pakistan.

History
The company was founded in August 1991 by Procter & Gamble.

In 1994, it acquired a soap-manufacturing facility at Hub, Balochistan and started making Safeguard.

In 2004, the company made an initial investment of about half a million US dollars to establish a PuR water purifier, manufacturing facility in Hub, Balochistan. The plant has a production capacity of 50 million sachets annually.

In 2010, the company inaugurated its Bin Qasim plant in Karachi.

In 2019, the company invested  for the state-of-the-art at hair care manufacturing facility at Port Qasim plant, Karachi. It will manufacture Pantene, and Head & Shoulders in Pakistan.

Its factories are located in Hub, Balochistan and Bin Qasim Port, Karachi.

Products Launched 
 2000 | Pampers
 2001 | Always

Brands

Personal Care

Duracell
Downy
Ariel
Safeguard
 Pantene
Head & Shoulders
Oral B
Olay
 Pampers
 Always
 Gillette
Gillette Mach3
Gillette Blue3
Gillette Fusion
Gillette Venus
 Vicks
 Camay
 Herbal Essences
 Wella
 Pert Plus

References

Procter & Gamble
Companies based in Karachi
Pakistani subsidiaries of foreign companies
Manufacturing companies established in 1991
Pakistani companies established in 1991